The 1924 South Carolina gubernatorial election was held on November 4, 1924 to select the governor of the state of South Carolina. Governor Thomas Gordon McLeod won the Democratic primary and ran unopposed in the general election being reelected for a second two-year term.

Democratic primary
The South Carolina Democratic Party held their primary for governor in the summer of 1924 and Governor McLeod was able to avoid a runoff election by obtaining over 50% of the vote in the primary election against J.T. Duncan.

General election
The general election was held on November 4, 1924 and Thomas McLeod was reelected  governor of South Carolina without opposition on account of South Carolina's single party government. Turnout increased by approximately 50% over the election in 1922 because there was also a presidential election.

 

|-
| 
| colspan=5 |Democratic hold
|-

See also
Governor of South Carolina
List of governors of South Carolina
South Carolina gubernatorial elections

References

"Report of the Secretary of State to the General Assembly of South Carolina.  Part II." Reports of State Officers Boards and Committees to the General Assembly of the State of South Carolina. Volume I. Columbia, South Carolina: 1925, p. 58.

External links
SCIway Biography of Governor Thomas Gordon McLeod

Gubernatorial
1924
1924 South Carolina elections
November 1924 events